The 1834 Dudley by-election was fought on 27 February 1834 after the sitting MP, Sir John Campbell, was appointed as Attorney General, triggering a by-election. Campbell's opponent was Thomas Hawkes, a local industrialist who owned a glass factory. The two men had previously contested the constituency of Stafford in 1830 and 1831.

The writ for the election arrived at Dudley on Sunday, 23 February and on the following day, the Returning Officer, Mr. Jenkins, announced that nominations would take place on Thursday 27 February. On the Monday and Wednesday before the election, disorder broke out in the town, with injuries inflicted and windows broken. At the hustings on election day, the candidacy of Campbell was proposed by Mr J. Twamley and seconded by James Foster. Hawkes was proposed and seconded respectively  by Mr C. Cartwight and Mr. W. Fellows. After election addresses, the Returning Officer asked for a show of hands in support of the rival candidates and Campbell was adjudged to have won this. The Hawkes' camp then requested a poll and at about 3pm voting ended and the result revealed that Thomas Hawkes had won the Dudley seat with a majority of 68. The result provoked considerable further disorder in the town resulting in a request for the military to intervene. Two troops of the 3rd Dragoon Guards arrived from Birmingham to clear the streets of rioters.

References

1834 in England
Politics of Dudley
By-elections to the Parliament of the United Kingdom in West Midlands (county) constituencies
By-elections to the Parliament of the United Kingdom in Worcestershire constituencies
19th century in Worcestershire
1834 elections in Europe
1830s elections in the United Kingdom